Hendrik Herzog (born 2 April 1969) is a German football coach and a former player. Herzog won several titles with BFC Dynamo during the East German era. He joined Schalke 04 after German reunification. He has worked as kit manager for Hertha BSC.

Career
Herzog was in Halle. He began playing football for the youth teams of SG Dynamo Halle-Neustadt and then SG Dynamo Eisleben. Herzog  was then allowed to join the youth academy of football club BFC Dynamo in 1981. He made his professional debut for BFC Dynamo away against FC Vorwärts Frankfurt in the 14th matchday of the 1986-87 DDR-Oberliga on 28 February 1987. Herzog played 271 top-flight matches in Germany: 63 matches in the East German DDR-Oberliga and 208 in the unified Bundesliga.

In the final year in the history of the East Germany national team the defender won seven caps.

Honours
	BFC Dynamo
 DDR-Oberliga: 1986–87, 1987–88
 FDGB-Pokal: 1987–88, 1988–89
 DFV-Supercup: 1989

VfB Stuttgart
 DFB-Pokal: 1996–97

External links

References

1969 births
Living people
East German footballers
Association football defenders
East Germany international footballers
German footballers
German football managers
Berliner FC Dynamo players
FC Schalke 04 players
VfB Stuttgart players
Hertha BSC players
SpVgg Unterhaching players
Bundesliga players
2. Bundesliga players
DDR-Oberliga players